Frankovci is a settlement on the left bank of the Drava River in the Municipality of Ormož in northeastern Slovenia, close to the border with Croatia. The area belongs to the traditional region of Styria and is now included in the Drava Statistical Region.

References

External links
Frankovci on Geopedia

Populated places in the Municipality of Ormož